Leon Quincy Jackson (January 9, 1926, or 1927–July 21, 1995), was an American architect and professor. He was known for his modernist building designs. He is thought to be the first black architect in Oklahoma, however he faced discrimination and was not able to take the state licensing exam. His architecture firm was named L. Quincy Jackson & Associates.

Early life and education 
Leon Quincy Jackson was born on January 9th on either 1926 or 1927 in Wewoka, Oklahoma. He was raised by his mother Roxie Ann Jackson, a high school principal and his stepfather Lonnie Galimore, a pharmacist. His mother was one-half Seminole and owned a large farm with oil reserves and a handful of active oil derricks.

He had studied at Wilberforce University and Iowa State University. Jackson received a B.A. degree in architecture (1950) from Kansas State University; and received a M.S. degree (1954) in planning from the University of Oklahoma (OU). Jackson was a student of Bruce Goff. The was the third black student to receive a masters degree in planning from OU.

Career 
In 1950, Jackson was the first African-American architect to open an office in the state of Oklahoma. He was hampered in taking his Oklahoma state licensing exam because of his race. 

Before receiving his master's degree, Jackson taught architectural engineering at Prairie View A&M University. In 1954, Haile Selassie, the Emperor of Ethiopia, visited Oklahoma State University–Stillwater in Stillwater, Oklahoma and Jackson attended the event. 

In 1954, Jackson moved to Nashville. He taught at Tennessee State University (TSU) from 1954 until ?. Jackson had established the architectural engineering program at TSU. He was an influence on many students, including architect Bob Wesley.

From 1966 until 1975, Jackson was a member of the American Institute of Architects (AIA).

Death and legacy 
Jackson died on July 21, 1995, and was buried in the Greenwood Cemetery in Nashville. Some of his buildings have been lost to fire or demolition but others remain standing.  

His son, Leon Jackson (1969–2016) also trained as an architect, and worked as a promoter of electronic music in Nashville, Tennessee.

List of buildings 
 Jackson House, 2026 Northeast Grand Boulevard (c. 1950s), Edwards Heights Historic District, Oklahoma City, Oklahoma; his former home
 Pagoda of Medicine (1963), former Riverside Adventist Hospital campus (now the Seventh-Day Adventist Church), 707 Youngs Lane, Nashville, Tennessee; now demolished

References

1926 births
1927 births
1995 deaths
Academics from Oklahoma
20th-century American architects
African-American people
Kansas State University alumni
University of Oklahoma alumni
Tennessee State University faculty
Black Seminole people
Prairie View A&M University faculty
Modernist architects from the United States
People from Wewoka, Oklahoma
People from Nashville, Tennessee